2012 in Ghana details events of note that has been predicted to happen in the Ghana in the year 2012.

Incumbents
 President - John Atta Mills (until July 24) John Dramani Mahama
 Vice President: Kwesi Amissah-Arthur
 Chief Justice: Georgina Wood
 Speaker of Parliament: Joyce Bamford-Addo

Events

January

February

March

April

May

June
 June 2 — Nigerian cargo plane crashes at the Kotoka International Airport, killing ten people.

July
 July 24 - John Atta Mills, President of Ghana, dies suddenly at the Military Hospital in Accra. 
 July 24 - John Dramani Mahama was sworn in as Ghana's new president

August
 August 6 - Kwesi Amissah-Arthur sworn in as Vice President of Ghana.

September

October

November

December
7 & 8 December - Presidential and parliamentary election to be held.

National holidays
Holidays in italics are "special days", while those in regular type are "regular holidays".
 January 1: New Year's Day
 March 6: Independence Day
 April 22 Good Friday
 May 1: Labor Day
 December 25: Christmas
 December 26: Boxing day

In addition, several other places observe local holidays, such as the foundation of their town. These are also "special days."

References

 
2010s in Ghana
Years of the 21st century in Ghana
Ghana
Ghana